Vanda Maria Ribeiro Furtado Tavares de Vasconcelos (born 17 June 1962), known professionally as Lio, is a Portuguese-Belgian singer and actress who was a pop icon in France and Belgium during the 1980s.

Life and career
Vanda Maria Ribeiro Furtado Tavares de Vasconcelos was born on 17 June 1962 in Mangualde, Portugal. When her father was called up to fight in the Portuguese Army, the family moved to Mozambique. Her parents divorced and, in 1968, Vanda moved with her mother and new stepfather to Brussels, Belgium, where her sister, actress Helena Noguerra, was born. In her teens she was determined to become a singer, and she was encouraged by singer-songwriter Jacques Duvall (né Eric Verwilghem), a family friend. She took her stage name, Lio, from a character in the Barbarella comic books by Jean-Claude Forest.

In 1979, together with songwriter Jay Alanski, she and Duvall began working with Marc Moulin and Dan Lacksman from the electro-trio Telex. Her first two singles were "Le Banana Split", which sold over 1 million copies, and "Amoureux solitaires", a song originally by punk rock band Stinky Toys. Both songs rose to the top of many pop charts in France, and Moulin and Lacksman also produced her self-titled first album. In 1982 the American music duo Ron and Russell Mael, of Sparks, worked with her on the album Suite sixtine, on which some of her previous songs were translated into English. Suite sixtine was compiled and art directed by Ralph Alfonso for Attic Records Canada, where it was originally released. Her second album, Amour toujours, was produced by Alain Chamfort and released in 1983. The same year, she first appeared on the screen in Chantal Akerman's film Golden Eighties, a lighthearted, humorous French pop musical about the people who work together in a Parisian shopping center. Lio plays a carefree hairdresser in the movie.. In 1984, she was featured in a TV special with France Gall called “Formule 1”, where she sang "Be My Baby" with Gall.

In 1985, she met record company executive and producer Michel Esteban, of ZE Records. She continued to have hit singles in Europe, including "Les brunes comptent pas pour des prunes", and travelled to Los Angeles with Esteban to record her next album Pop model. Several of the tracks were co-produced by John Cale, formerly of the Velvet Underground, and the album produced the hits "Fallait pas commencer", "Je casse tout ce que je touche", and "Chauffeur". In 1988, after she had given birth to a daughter with Esteban, she resumed her acting career, starring in Claude Lelouch's film Itinéraire d'un enfant gâté. The Lio-Esteban partnership produced another album, Can can, recorded in Los Angeles and Rio de Janeiro. She also designed a fashion collection for the European department store chain Prisunic.

She appeared in three films in 1990 and 1991, Chambre à part, Sans un cri, and Après l'amour. Her 1991 album, Des fleurs pour un caméléon, was produced by Étienne Daho, she had already contributed vocals for one of Daho's earliest and biggest hits, "Week-End À Rome". Daho was given carte blanche in the studio because Lio was busy shooting a film; however, when his work was over, he showed no interest in promoting the album with her, limiting the success of the album. Her next album, Wandatta, presenting a more mature approach in contrast with her previous image, and with a sleeve designed by Guy Peellaert, was released in 1995. However, it was relatively unsuccessful, and she withdrew for a time to live near Angoulême with her partner and children. In 1998, she recorded with Esteban in Cuba, and in 1999 she appeared in 50 performances of the French adaptation of Seven Brides For Seven Brothers, a musical staged at the Folies Bergère. She had two kids that year. She released the single "Je suis comme je suis" and the album Chante Prévert containing interpretations of the poems of Jacques Prévert, in 2000. After performing the songs on tour throughout France, Europe and North Africa, she released the live album Cœur de rubis in 2004. She also appeared in over 250 performances of the theater play Le Bébé, an adaptation of a book by Marie Darrieussecq staged by Marc Goldberg.

Since 2008, Lio has been a judge on the French "pop idol" show Nouvelle Star.  In 2009, she returned to music with the rock band Phantom. In 2011, she became a judge on The Voice Belgique.

As of 2012, several of Lio's songs (like her 1982 song "Mona Lisa") have been rediscovered and used as samples in numerous songs by artists in the Nu-disco, House and EDM genres. In 2014, she gave an acoustic rendition of several songs by the Brazilian composer Dorival Caymmi at the Archiduc café in central Brussels.

In March 2018, she released her new album Lio Canta Caymmi on the label Crammed Discs. It consists of half-Portuguese, half-French covers of songs by the Brazilian composer Dorival Caymmi. It was the first time she recorded an entire album in Portuguese, her mother tongue. She had previously released a cover of the Brazilian standard "The Girl from Ipanema" in 1991 but she sang the English lyrics.

Discography

Albums

 Phantom featuring Lio was released in the UK under the title Lio et les fantômes.

Live albums
 2003: Cœur de rubis

Compilations
 1982: Suite sixtine (a mixture of b-sides, English versions of previous songs and unreleased tracks; originally exclusive to Canada)
 1995: Peste Of!
 2005: Les Pop Songs (Best of 1)
 2005: Les Ballades (Best of 2)
 2005: Pop Box – 25 Years in Pop (7 remastered CDs with bonus tracks and 1 DVD of clips)
 2008: Je garde quelques images... pour mes vies postérieures (double CD containing a mixture of hits and Lio's personal favorites)

Singles
{| class="wikitable"
!align="center" rowspan="2"|Year
!align="center" rowspan="2"|Single
!align="center" colspan="1"|Chart
!align="center" rowspan="2"|Album
|-
!width="40"|FRA
|-
|align="center" rowspan="1"|1979
|"Le Banana Split"
|align="center"|1
|align="center" rowspan="3"|Lio
|-
|align="center" rowspan="3"|1980
|"Amoureux solitaires"
|align="center"|1
|-
|"Amicalement votre"
|align="center"|19
|-
|"Sage comme une image" 
|align="center"|-
|align="center" rowspan="2"|Suite sixtine
|-
|align="center" rowspan="1"|1982
|"Mona Lisa"
|align="center"|-
|-
|align="center" rowspan="2"|1983
|"Zip a doo wah"
|align="center"|-
|align="center" rowspan="2"|Amour toujours
|-
|"La Reine des pommes"
|align="center"|-
|-
|align="center" rowspan="1"|1985
|"Tétéou" (Lio featuring Jacky)
|align="center"|48
|align="center" rowspan="1"|-
|-
|align="center" rowspan="2"|1986
|"Les Brunes comptent pas pour des prunes"
|align="center"|10
|align="center" rowspan="5"|Pop model
|-
|"Les Filles veulent tout" (Canada only)
|align="center"|-
|-
|align="center" rowspan="4"|1987
|"Fallait pas commencer"
|align="center"|5
|-
|"Je casse tout ce que je touche"
|align="center"|22
|-
|"Chauffeur suivez cette voiture"
| align="center" |-
|-
|"La Bamba" (Los Portos featuring Lio)
| align="center" |-
|align="center" rowspan="1"|-
|-
|align="center" rowspan="1"|1988
|"Seules les filles pleurent"
|align="center"|-
|align="center" rowspan="2"|Can can
|-
|align="center" rowspan="1"|1989
|"Tu es formidable"
|align="center"|-
|-
|align="center" rowspan="1"|1990
|"The Girl from Ipanema" (Lio featuring Etienne Daho)
|align="center"|-
|align="center" rowspan="2"|Des fleurs pour un Caméléon
|-
|align="center" rowspan="1"|1991
|"L'Autre joue"
|align="center"|-
|-
|align="center" rowspan="1"|1995
|"Le Banana Split 95"
|align="center"|-
|align="center" rowspan="1"|Peste Of!
|-
|align="center" rowspan="2"|1996
|"Tristeza"
|align="center"|-
|align="center" rowspan="1"|Wandatta
|-
|"A la fête des animaux" (promo only)
|align="center"|-
|align="center" rowspan="1"|-
|-
|align="center" rowspan="1"|1998
|"Ganja" (Lio featuring Los Van Van) (remix)
|align="center"|-
|align="center" rowspan="1"|-
|-
|align="center" rowspan="1"|2000
|"Je suis comme je suis"
|align="center"|-
|align="center" rowspan="1"|Chante Prévert
|-
|align="center" rowspan="1"|2005
|"Les Hommes me vont si bien" (promo only)
|align="center"|-
|align="center" rowspan="1"|Dites au prince charmant
|-
|align="center" rowspan="1"|2007
|"Les Matins de Paris" (Teki Latex featuring Lio)
|align="center"|14
|align="center" rowspan="1"|Party de plaisir (Teki Latex album)
|-
|align="center" rowspan="2"|2009
|"Je ne veux que ton bien" (Phantom featuring Lio)
|align="center"|-
|align="center" rowspan="2"|Phantom featuring Lio
|-
|"La Veille de ma naissance" (Phantom featuring Lio)
|align="center"|-
|-
|align="center" rowspan="1"|2014
|"Poupée pop"
|align="center"|-
|align="center" rowspan="1"|-
|-
|align="center"|2018
|"É Doce Morrer No Mar" (featuring Jacques Duvall)
|align="center"|-
|align="center" rowspan="1|Lio Canta Caymmi|-
|}

Theatre
 2004 : Le Bébé'' by Marie Darrieussecq, directed by Marc Goldberg

Filmography

Bibliography

References

External links

Lio's Biography on ZE Records Official Website
 
 

1962 births
Living people
People from Mangualde
Belgian women pop singers
Women new wave singers
Belgian dance musicians
Belgian people of Portuguese descent
French-language singers of Belgium
ZE Records artists
Attic Records (Canada) artists
Belgian feminists
Belgian film actresses
Belgian television actresses
20th-century Belgian actresses
21st-century Belgian actresses
Feminist musicians
Walloon musicians